Francisco Xesús Jorquera Caselas (born 31 August 1961) is a Spanish politician of the Galician Nationalist Bloc (BNG). He was a Senator (2005–08) and a member of the Congress of Deputies (2008–2012), and led his party in the Parliament of Galicia from 2012 to 2016.

Biography
Born in Ferrol, Jorquera graduated in Geography and History from the University of Santiago de Compostela. While there, he was the secretary general of the Galician Revolutionary Students (ERGA) and a member of the Galician National-Popular Assembly (ANPG), before partaking in the foundation of the Galician Nationalist Bloc (BNG) in 1982. He was a member of the party's national council in the early 1980s and again from 2001, joining its executive in 2003.

Jorquera was a member of the Senate of Spain from 2005 to 2008, being appointed by the Parliament of Galicia and the only BNG member in the upper house of the Cortes Generales. In 2008, he was elected to the Congress of Deputies to represent A Coruña, and was re-elected in 2011.

In January 2012, Jorquera was chosen as the BNG's lead candidate for the 2012 Galician regional election. The results in October saw his party come fourth, falling by five seats to seven. In 2016, shortly before the next election, he ceded his responsibilities to the next candidate, Ana Pontón.

Jorquera was chosen in June 2018 as the BNG's leader for the 2019 local election in A Coruña. His party rose from one councillor to two, and voted for Inés Rey of the Socialist Party of Galicia (PSdeG) to be mayor.

References

Living people
1961 births
People from Ferrol, Spain
University of Santiago de Compostela alumni
Galician Nationalist Bloc politicians
Members of the 9th Parliament of Galicia
Members of the 9th Congress of Deputies (Spain)
Members of the 10th Congress of Deputies (Spain)
Members of the 8th Senate of Spain